José da Costa Sacco (born 1930) is a Brazilian botanist.

He was a professor at the Universidade Federal de Pelotas and is still living in Pelotas in Brazil. He specialised in the genus Passiflora and has named and published many species including Passiflora edmundoi. The Brazilian botanist Armando Carlos Cervi has named Passiflora saccoi after him.

Selected publications
'Identificação das principais variedades de trigo do sul do Brasil'; in: Boletim técnico do Instituto Agronómico do Sul deel 26, 1960, Instituto Agronómico do Sul, Pelotas
'Passifloraceae', in: A.R. Schultz (ed), Flora ilustrada do Rio Grande do Sul, pp 7–29, 1962, Instituto de Ciências Naturais, Universidade Federal do Rio Grande do Sul (UFRGS), Porto Alegre
'Contribuição ao estudo das Passifloraceae do Brasil: Duas novas espécies de Passiflora'; In: Sellowia No. 18, 41–46, 1966
'Contribuição ao estudo das Passifloraceae do Brasil: Passiflora margaritae'; in: Sellowia, 19: 59–61, 1967
'Passifloráceas'; in: R. Reitz (ed), Flora ilustrada catarinense, pp 1–130, 1980, Herbário Barbosa Rodrigues, Itajaí, SC
'Passiflora castellanosii'; in: Bradea 1 (33): 346–348, 1973
'Una nova especie de Passiflora da Bolívia: Passiflora pilosicorona'; in: Bradea 1 (33): 349–352, 1973

References

External links 
José da Costa Sacco on the website of Harvard University Herbarium

20th-century Brazilian botanists
Academic staff of the Federal University of Pelotas
Living people
1930 births